Andrew James Knight (November 23, 1961 – April 11, 2008) was a Canadian animator, film and television director, voice actor, and creator of Ned's Newt, Pig City and Get Ed.

Life and career
Andy Knight was born in Pembroke, Ontario, the son of Geoffrey and Betty Knight, and has two older siblings, Fiona Knight-Gagné and Peter Knight.

Knight's entry into the animation industry was with the Gaumont Film Company in Paris. During his time in France he worked on a number of film and television projects, including the Inspector Gadget series. In 1989 he moved to London, as Creative Director of the Passion Pictures studio. In 1992 he and his wife, Linzi, struck out on their own, founding Red Rover Studios in London. In 1996 they were persuaded to open the Disney Canada studio in Toronto, to which they agreed on condition that The Walt Disney Company finance the move of Red Rover to Toronto, as well.

Over the years, among a large body of work, he contributed to three Asterix films as a storyboard artist and supervisor, was animation director for the 2000 DreamWorks production Joseph: King of Dreams, directed the Disney animated film Beauty and the Beast: The Enchanted Christmas, and was the writer and director of the BAFTA- and Annie Award-nominated 2003 short Plumber. In addition, he created, developed, wrote, animated and directed many award-winning commercial and television projects, including the animated series Ned's Newt, Pig City, and Get Ed.

He died of a stroke on April 11, 2008.

According to the Canadian Film Centre, his wife and partner, Linzi, was a 2010 alumnus of its film director program, has also passed away.

References

External links

Film directors from Ontario
Canadian storyboard artists
Canadian television directors
Canadian animated film directors
People from Pembroke, Ontario
2008 deaths
1961 births
Walt Disney Animation Studios people